Angela Brookins-Gillispie (born November 24, 1971), better known as Jacki-O, is an American rapper who is now signed to her own label Virtuous Woman Entertainment. Born in Florida, she got her first break in 2003 with the sex rap "P (Real Good)", best known under its clean name "Nookie", which garnered the MC comparisons to fellow Southern rapper Trina. Although it was the first time that many had heard of Jacki-O, she kept a high profile, prior to her radio and club successes, with several appearances on Miami-area mixtapes.

The success of "Nookie" led Jacki-O to discuss a similar subject matter on her second single, "Sugar Walls," released in 2004 in anticipation of her debut album, Poe Little Rich Girl Throughout her career, Jacki-O had worked with a variety of producers and rappers such as Timbaland, Busta Rhymes, Ghostface Killah, Ying Yang Twins and DJ Khaled. In 2014, Jacki-O reported her retirement in rap from her Facebook account saying, "she was getting closer to God and he is changing her life around". She is married and an ordained minister.

Early life
Angela Brookins was born on November 24, 1971 to an African-American mother and a Haitian/African-American father. She has two sisters and two brothers. Jacki-O grew up in the Pork & Beans public housing complex in the Liberty City neighborhood of Miami, Florida. She started writing poetry in middle school and freestyle rap in high school. Brookins dropped out of high school, but later earned a GED.
Brookins started getting in trouble for stealing at a young age. As she got older, she became known for committing credit card fraud and stealing items from stores to resell at half price - which she frequently discussed in her music. 
On December 23, 1989, Brookins gave birth to a daughter, Brittany Di'Angelis. Brookins was 17.

Music career

In 2002, Jacki teamed up with Poe Boy Entertainment to obtain a recording contract; in the process, she helped established the Poe Boy brand with her first mixtape, entitled The Official Bootlegg. It went on to sell over 470,000 copies and was downloaded over 250,000 times. Subsequently, she released her first music video, "Nookie", which became her biggest hit to date. 
In 2008, Jacki-O revealed to Hip Hop Weekly that she was forced to have sex with a Poe Boy Entertainment executive to receive a $10,000 advance that she was previously promised. After the interview garnered negative comments, Jacki-O explained that she was not proud of what occurred, but wanted to come forward about abuse she endured in the industry. She said, "I'm very talented and my music speaks for itself. I don't have to have sex to get to where I need to be at. The authority that I was under … I was being abused by the authority."

In 2004, Jacki-O was signed to TVT Records, whereupon she released another music video, "Fine", (featuring the Ying Yang Twins), as well as two more singles, "Slow Down" and "Sugar Walls". Her debut album, Poe Little Rich Girl, was released October 26, 2004, selling 90,345 in its first week.

Her next mixtape, released four years later in 2008, was entitled Jack-Da Rippa and featured the singles "I Got Yo Man", "3rd Eye", "Cool It Now" and "Queen Of The South". This led to a recording contract with her own label imprint Jackmove Ent. the next year, where she released Lil Red Riding Hood, featuring her newest single, "Baby Mama", as the lead-off track. Following this, she released a mixtape entitled BBBP (Bad Bitches Bang Pink).

In March 2010, Jacki-O announced that she is gearing up for the release of a new street album/mixtape, titled Griselda Blanco, which she plans to release digitally. The first single released from the mixtape was entitled, 'Bang Bang,' and was a rumoured verbal attack on fellow female rapper Lil' Kim.

In 2014, Jacki-O announced via her official Facebook account that she transitioned from Gangsta rap to Christian hip hop due to religious commitment, stating that she has been "touched by God" and that she will release her next album when the timing is right. Jacki-O net worth is $1.7 million in assets.

Writing
Jacki-O's first novel is called Grown & Gangsta (2008), an "urban tale". She is currently working on an autobiography called Relentless (est. 2010), in which she will "detail her life growing up in Miami, her rise to fame as a rapper, and her charity work with people with disabilities."

Hip hop feuds

Foxy Brown
On April 23, 2005, an altercation occurred between Jacki-O and Foxy Brown at Circle House Studios in Miami, Florida. Jacki-O stated that her refusal to "bow down" to Brown was the prime motive in the physical altercation. A day following the incident, she stated to MTV News: "I just know that yesterday I did not go there to get in no altercation.more."

Khia
In the leadup to the release of Khia's second album - Gangstress - in 2006, she  made disparaging comments about Jacki-O in magazine interviews. At the first annual Ozone Magazine Awards in 2006, both rappers were in attendance and claimed to be the "Queen of the South" onstage while  presenting awards. Jacki-O had her crew and bodyguards dressed in shirts that said "Fuck Khia" on the front and "Jacki-O Queen of the South!" on the back. Khia responded to the shirts by saying, "It's promotion for me. I thanked them. It's marketing and promotion. I'm so happy about that!" Later, Jacki-O dropped a diss track against Khia called "Pop Off." In response, Khia dropped a diss track called "Hit Her Up," in which she repeatedly insinuated that Jacki-O was transgender.

DJ Khaled
Although Jacki-O gave DJ Khaled a positive shoutout in her 2004 mixtape The Official Bootleg, she claimed that he did not truly support Miami rappers in a 2010 interview with XXL Mag. In the interview, Jacki-O said that she believed Khaled felt more powerful as a DJ than artists themselves, and further claimed that Khaled only pretended to be from Miami.

Personal life
Before fame, Jacki-O was arrested for various crimes - including shoplifting, trafficking cocaine, aggravated assault, and carrying a concealed firearm. Her first arrest was for shoplifting a diary as an elementary school student. Jacki-O revealed that once she started making money from music, her mother still distrusted her and refused to go to the bank with her.
In January 2006, in an attempt to break her recording contract with Poe Boy Entertainment, Jacki-O filed for Chapter 7 bankruptcy - declaring debts of $144,225 and assets of $1,340. Later that year, she was arrested for shoplifting twice - once from Neiman Marcus and later from Bal Harbor. 
In a 2008 interview with Hip Hop Weekly magazine, Jacki-O revealed that she was forced to have sex with a Poe Boy Entertainment executive to receive a $10,000 advance that she was previously promised. Although she received backlash for discussing her experience, she remained adamant that she was not glorifying having sex for money and that she was a victim of abused authority.

Discography

Albums

Mixtapes
 The Official Bootleg (2004)
 Free Agent (2006)
 Jack Tha Rippa (2007)
 Grown & Gangsta (2008)
 BBBP (Bad Bitches Bang Pink) (2009)
 Griselda Blanco, La Madrina (2010)
 Straight From The Underground (2011)

References

Living people
TVT Records artists
African-American women singer-songwriters
African-American women rappers
American rappers of Haitian descent
Rappers from Miami
Southern hip hop musicians
21st-century American women writers
Writers from Miami
21st-century American rappers
21st-century African-American women singers
Singer-songwriters from Florida
21st-century women rappers
1971 births